Kimana is small town in  Kajiado South Constituency. Kimana is located in the Loitokitok District with Tanzania to the West, the Kajiado District to the North, Kibwezi District to the East and Taveta District to the South. Agriculture is difficult due to the semi-arid climate. Kimana has a Public Health Centre that offers basic health treatments such as pharmaceuticals and medical consultancy. There is also a small Camp which offers rented tents for tourists visiting on Safari.

References

Populated places in Rift Valley Province